CyraCom International, Inc. is an American language services company that provides over the phone and video interpretation and language assessment services. It is the largest provider of telephone interpretation services in the United States.
 
CyraCom was originally founded as Kevmark Industries in 1995, when co-founder Mark Myers invented the first dual-handset telephone. Myers and co-founder Kevin Carey built a prototype with two handsets connected to a single base, allowing both patients and providers to speak to an interpreter on a three-way call without passing a handset back and forth. The device later became known as the CyraPhone.
 
The company name was changed to CyraCom in 1997, named for Edmond Rostand's Cyrano de Bergerac. It operates call centers and offices in the United States with one office in the United Kingdom, and another in Costa Rica. Cyracom provides interpreters for hundreds of languages.

References 

Telephone services
Language interpretation
American companies established in 1995
Business services companies of the United States
Telecommunications companies of the United States